Bobeldijk is a hamlet in the Dutch province of North Holland. It is a part of the municipality of Koggenland, and lies about 5 km west of Hoorn.

The village was first mentioned in 1450 as "den Boebeldijck", and means "dike with spike rushes (Eleocharis)". Bobeldijk has place name signs. The village was home to 165 people in 1840.

References

Populated places in North Holland
Koggenland